TWS may refer to:
 Captain America: The Winter Soldier – a 2014 film
 Texas World Speedway – a road-racing track in College Station, Texas
 The Weekly Standard
 The White Stripes – an American rock band
 The White Stripes (album) – 1999 debut album by The White Stripes
 The Wilberforce Society – a Cambridge-based think tank
 The Wilderness Society (Australia)
 The Wilderness Society (United States)
 The Williams School
 Thermal weapon sight
 Toad the Wet Sprocket
 Track while scan – a radar mode
 True wind speed;  see Apparent wind#Apparent wind in sailing
 True Wireless Stereo;  see Headphones#True wireless
 Tsunami warning system